Jeb Brown (born 1963/1964) is an American actor known for his work in theatre. Brown has appeared in productions on- and off-Broadway including Grease, Spider-Man: Turn Off the Dark, and Beautiful: The Carole King Musical, in which he originated the role of Don Kirshner.

Life and career
A native of Greenwich, Connecticut, Brown made his Broadway debut at the age of ten, in Cat on a Hot Tin Roof. Before pursuing a full-time acting career, he earned a degree in theater studies from Yale, where he was a member of the a cappella group The Whiffenpoofs.

Since Cat on a Hot Tin Roof, Brown has performed in eight Broadway productions. Most recently, he originated the role of music publisher Don Kirshner in Beautiful: The Carole King Musical (2014). He has also appeared in numerous off-Broadway musicals and television shows, including Hulu's The Path (2016–2018), in which he played recurring character Wesley Cox.

Acting credits

Theatre

Film

Television

References

External links 
 
 
 
 

Living people
Male actors from Connecticut
20th-century American male actors
21st-century American male actors
American male stage actors
American male musical theatre actors
American male film actors
American male television actors
Yale University alumni
Year of birth missing (living people)